Marina Nikolayevna Znak-Sinelshchikova (born 17 May 1961 in East Berlin, East Germany) is a Belarusian rower.

References 
 
 

1961 births
Living people
Belarusian female rowers
Rowers from Berlin
Rowers at the 1988 Summer Olympics
Rowers at the 1992 Summer Olympics
Rowers at the 1996 Summer Olympics
Rowers at the 2000 Summer Olympics
Olympic bronze medalists for Belarus
Olympic rowers of Belarus
Olympic rowers of the Unified Team
Olympic rowers of the Soviet Union
Soviet female rowers
Olympic medalists in rowing
World Rowing Championships medalists for the Soviet Union
Medalists at the 1996 Summer Olympics
World Rowing Championships medalists for Belarus